The seventh season of Modern Family was ordered on May 7, 2015, by ABC. The season premiered on September 23, 2015. The season was produced by Steven Levitan Productions and Picador Productions in association with 20th Century Fox Television, with creators Steven Levitan and Christopher Lloyd as showrunners. On March 3, 2016, ABC renewed the show for an eighth season.

Cast

Main cast
 Ed O'Neill as Jay Pritchett 
 Sofía Vergara as Gloria Pritchett
 Julie Bowen as Claire Dunphy 
 Ty Burrell as Phil Dunphy 
 Jesse Tyler Ferguson as Mitchell Pritchett 
 Eric Stonestreet as Cameron Tucker 
 Sarah Hyland as Haley Dunphy 
 Ariel Winter as Alex Dunphy 
 Nolan Gould as Luke Dunphy 
 Rico Rodriguez as Manny Delgado
 Aubrey Anderson-Emmons as Lily Tucker-Pritchett
 Jeremy Maguire as Joe Pritchett

Recurring cast
 Adam DeVine as Andy Bailey
 Reid Ewing as Dylan Marshall
 Spenser McNeil as Reuben Rand
 Joe Mande as Ben

Guest cast

 Justin Kirk as Charlie Bingham
 Laura Ashley Samuels as Beth
 Suraj Partha as Sanjay Patel
 Jon Polito as Earl Chambers
 Brooke Sorenson as Tammy LaFontaine
 Catherine O'Hara as Debra Radcliffe
 Andrea Martin as Fig
 Ray Liotta as himself
 Barbra Streisand as herself (voice only)
 Keegan-Michael Key as Tom
 June Squibb as Auntie Alice
 Ernie Hudson as Miles
 Nathan Lane as Pepper Saltzman
 Christian Barillas as Ronaldo
 Kevin Daniels as Longines
 Mekia Cox as Angie
 Dana Powell as Pam Tucker
 Shelley Long as DeDe Pritchett
 Simon Templeman as Simon Hastings
 Dominic Sherwood as James
 Illeana Douglas as Janet
 Isabella Gomez as Flavia

Production
Modern Family was renewed for a seventh season on May 7, 2015, by ABC. It was announced that the show will be recasting Joe, the son of Jay and Gloria, who has been played by Pierce Wallace for the previous two seasons. On August 7, 2015, the role of Joe had been recast by actor Jeremy Maguire. The table read for the premiere happened on August 3, 2015, being confirmed by Sofia Vergara. Filming for the seventh season began shortly after the table read.

Episodes

Reception 
The seventh season received mixed reviews from critics. Kyle Fowle from The A.V. Club gave half of the season's episodes a B- or less. The middle third of the season was more warmly received, especially the episodes "Playdates," "Spread Your Wings," and "Clean for a Day." The three episodes received a B+, A- and B+, respectively.

Ratings

References

External links
 

2015 American television seasons
2016 American television seasons
7